Percy Thomas Mills (7 May 1879 — 8 December 1950) was an English cricketer who played first-class cricket for Gloucestershire between 1902 and 1929. In his long career, Mills scored over 5,000 runs and took more than 800 wickets.

References

1879 births
1950 deaths
English cricketers
Gloucestershire cricketers
Players cricketers
Berkshire cricketers
Sportspeople from Cheltenham
English cricketers of 1919 to 1945